Senrayan is an Indian actor who has predominantly worked in Tamil language films. After making his acting debut in Vetrimaaran's Polladhavan (2007), he appeared in other small roles before winning acclaim for his portrayal of a petty criminal in Moodar Koodam (2013). He has since appeared in antagonistic and comedic roles in films, including Puthiya Niyamam (2016) and Metro (2016).

Career
Senrayan made his acting debut in Vetrimaaran's Polladhavan (2007), and later also played a small role in the director's Aadukalam (2011) with both of the films starring Dhanush. He made a breakthrough with his performance in Moodar Koodam (2013) portraying a young criminal. The success of the film prompted him to play several similar antagonistic roles in films including Puthiya Niyamam (2016) and Metro (2016). In 2015, he played the lead role in the small budget film, Vishayam Veliye Theriya Koodadhu, which went unnoticed at the box office.

In 2018, he was a contestant in the Tamil reality television show, Bigg Boss hosted by Kamal Haasan.

Personal life
Senrayan married Kayalvizhi at Senraaya Perumal Kovil in Vathalagundu during August 2014. She later announced her pregnancy during her brief visit to the Bigg Boss house when Senrayan was a contestant.

On 13 May 2021, Senrayan was tested positive for COVID-19.

Filmography

Film

Television

References

External links
Instagram : https://instagram.com/senrayan_official?igshid=r6epg4uvmsml

Living people
Male actors in Tamil cinema
21st-century Indian male actors
Indian male comedians
Tamil male actors
Tamil comedians
Male actors in Telugu cinema
Indian male film actors
Male actors in Malayalam cinema
1982 births
Bigg Boss (Tamil TV series) contestants